Pythium middletonii is a plant pathogen infecting strawberry.

References

External links
 Index Fungorum
 USDA ARS Fungal Database

Water mould strawberry diseases
Species described in 1960
middletonii